Banhalan-e Bala (also Romanized as Bānhalān-e Bālā; also known as Bānhalān) is a village in Dustan Rural District, Badreh District, Darreh Shahr County, Ilam Province, Iran. At the 2006 census, its population was 250, in 47 families. The village is populated by Kurds.

References 

Populated places in Darreh Shahr County
Kurdish settlements in Ilam Province